Sainte-Marie-du-Bois may refer to the following communes in France:

Sainte-Marie-du-Bois, Manche, in the Manche département
Sainte-Marie-du-Bois, Mayenne, in the Mayenne département

See also

Sainte-Marie-au-Bosc, in the Seine-Maritime département